Melodifestivalen 2005 was the selection for the 45th song to represent Sweden at the Eurovision Song Contest. It was the 44th time that this system of picking a song had been used. Five heats had taken place to select the ten songs for the final, in Gothenburg, Linköping, Skellefteå, Växjö and a Second Chance round in Stockholm. The final was broadcast on SVT1 and Sveriges Radio's P4 network, with viewing figures of approximately 4,055,000 and with 1,519,997 televotes cast. Nanne Grönvall's defeat was met with consternation by many people, who felt that a gap of over 150,000 votes should be enough for victory. There were even calls for SVT to scrap the jury system altogether and simply let the televotes decide the winner. For a comparison, it was noted that Grönvall had received more votes than Lena Philipsson, the popular 2004 winner. However, SVT said that there was nothing they could do about the result. Four finalists topped the Swedish charts. Alcazar and Alcastar got to number one the week before the final, Jimmy Jansson got to the number one some weeks after that with Vi kan gunga, Martin Stenmarck's winner Las Vegas hit the top spot the week after that, while Nanne Grönvall and Håll om mig topped the charts the week after that.

Heats
The heats for Melodifestivalen 2005 began on 12 February 2005. Ten songs from these heats qualified for the final on March 12, 2005. This was the fourth year that a heat format had been used for the competition.

Preselection

Artists that submitted songs

Kikki Danielsson, Sara Löfgren, Arvingarna, Sandra Dahlberg, Roger Pontare, Tommy Nilsson, Jessica Folcker, Grymlings, Freddie Wadling, Mikael Rickfors, Mats Ronander, Hasse Andersson & Kvinnaböske Band, Niclas Wahlgren, Pernilla Wahlgren, Linus Wahlgren, Lotta Engberg, Mathias Holmgren, Alex Falk, Johan Thorsell, Ingela 'Pling' Forsman, Lars 'Dille' Diedricsson, Peter Grönvall, Nanne Grönvall.

Heat 1

Heat 2

Heat 3

Heat 4

Second Chance Round

Results

Juries

Televotes

Returning artists

See also
Eurovision Song Contest 2005
Sweden in the Eurovision Song Contest
Sweden in the Eurovision Song Contest 2005

Footnotes

External links
Melodifestivalen at SVT's open archive
Poplight.se: Melodifestivalen 2005 

2005 Swedish television seasons
2005
Eurovision Song Contest 2005
2005 in Swedish music
2005 song contests
February 2005 events in Europe
March 2005 events in Europe
2000s in Stockholm
2000s in Gothenburg
Events in Linköping
Events in Skellefteå
Events in Stockholm
Events in Gothenburg